Keith McNaughton (born 20 August 1921) is a former  Australian rules footballer who played with South Melbourne in the Victorian Football League (VFL).

Football
As a schoolboy, at Mount Carmel College, Middle Park, he had been trained by the ex-Collingwood footballer and 1924 Stawell Gift winner Bill Twomey (who, at the time, was also the coach of the South Melbourne Second XVIII), and he had been captain of the school's football team.

He played for South Sydney, without a clearance from any Victorian football authority, at the age of 16, in the Sydney Football League in 1937. Because he had played in Sydney without a clearance, he was considered to be an interstate player when he returned to Victoria (in November 1937); and, under the rules of the time, he was prevented from signing with a VFL (or VFL-affiliated) team for two years. He was recruited from the Victoria Brewery team for the final game of the 1940 season.

Boxing
Listed at the start of the 1941 season among the "Players to Train with Seconds" at South Melbourne,  he gave up football, and became a professional boxer, fighting as a welterweight under the name of "Al Moran". In his last fight, at the West Melbourne Stadium, against Clem Sands of Newcastle, "Moran survived a torrid attack . . . was in an ace of being knocked out . . . in a dramatic last round . . . and won on points".

Later life
In 1949 it was reported that "Al Moran has opened a grill bar and hamburger shop in Victoria Street, Richmond".

Notes

References

External links 

1921 births
Possibly living people
Australian rules footballers from Victoria (Australia)
Sydney Swans players